Paul van Imschoot (17 September 188925 May 1968; full name Paul Emile Armand Joseph van Imschoot) was a Catholic priest of the Diocese of Ghent and Professor of Exegesis at the seminary of Ghent from 19191948. His best-known work is Théologie de l’Ancien Testament (Tournai, 19541956), the last Catholic-authored Old Testament theology prior to the Second Vatican Council.

Scholarship
Van Imschoot penned more than 70 essays in Latin and French for the diocesan journal Collationes Gandavenses and over 130 articles in Dutch for the Bijbelsch Woordenboek, an encyclopedic Bible dictionary produced by the Catholic seminary faculties of the Netherlands and Flanders. Following retirement from teaching, van Imschoot was among the early members of the Colloquium Biblicum Lovaniense, an annual meeting of Catholic biblical scholars. He served as the society's president in 1953 and chaired the biblical theology section of the International Catholic Bible Congress, convened in the Vatican pavilion of the 1958 World's Fair in Brussels.

Van Imschoot intended that his magnum opus Théologie de l’Ancien Testament encompass three volumes, but he only completed the first, Tome I: Dieu (also available in English translation) and the second, Tome II: L’Homme. Despite van Imschoot's notoriety in Catholic circles during his lifetime, the dual influences of systematic theology and Neo-Scholastic Thomism upon his work likely limited its reception within the broader academic field of biblical theology.

Bibliography
 Paul van Imschoot, Théologie de l’Ancien Testament, 2 vols., Desclée, 19541956.
 Paul van Imschoot, Jesus Christus, Romen, 1941.
 Adrianus van den Born, et al., Bijbelsch Woordenboek, Romen, 1941.

Further reading 
 Scott N. Callaham, "Must Biblical and Systematic Theology Remain Apart? Reflection on Paul van Imschoot," Journal for the Evangelical Study of the Old Testament 5.1 (2016): 1-26.
 David A. Hubbard, "Paul van Imschoot," in Robert B. Laurin, ed., Contemporary Old Testament Theologians (Judson Press, 1970), 191-215.

References

External links
 Paul van Imschoot entry in Biographisch-Bibliographisches Kirchenlexikon (in German)

1889 births
1968 deaths
20th-century Belgian Roman Catholic theologians
Old Testament scholars
Clergy from Ghent